is a Japanese musician from Nagasaki. He debuted in 2009 with the song "Comoesta" featuring Massattack from Spontania. He gained prominence in Japan after he provided an opening theme for Naruto: Shōnen Hen, and then the second ending theme for Heroman. He describes himself as the postman singer, referring to his previous career.

Discography

Singles
"Comoesta" feat. Massattack from Spontania - 
 feat. BAKI - 
 - 
Naruto: Shōnen Hen opening theme (Episodes 68 - Current)
 - 
Heroman ending theme (Episodes 13 - Current)

References

External links
Official website
Official blog
Official GREE blog
Staff blog

1982 births
Japanese musicians
Living people
People from Nagasaki
Musicians from Nagasaki Prefecture